Edmond Graile (fl. 1611), was an English poet.

Graile was born at Gloucester about 1577. He matriculated at Magdalen College, Oxford, on 10 February 1592 – 1593, graduated B.A. in February 1594–5, and M.A. in 1600. He was afterwards physician of St. Bartholomew's Hospital, Gloucester. Verses to Sir William Throckmorton and his wife are prefixed. 'The third impression,' with an appendix of original prayers, was issued in 1632, 8vo, and of this edition alone is there a copy in the British Museum.

References

1570s births
People from Gloucester
17th-century deaths
16th-century English poets
17th-century English poets
17th-century English male writers
Alumni of Magdalen College, Oxford
English religious writers
17th-century English medical doctors
English male poets